Ghostwalk is a book that introduced a campaign setting for the 3rd edition of the Dungeons & Dragons game, similar to Forgotten Realms or Dragonlance.  Unlike most other D&D settings, Ghostwalk was designed to be released as a single book which would contain all the material for the world.

Contents
The central locale for the Ghostwalk setting is a city called Manifest, a mausoleum city built atop a geological feature known as the Veil of Souls which leads the spirits of the departed to the True Afterlife.  In the immediate surroundings of the city of Manifest, the ghosts of the dead may cross the barrier into the land of the living and interact with their loved ones as translucent beings forged of ectoplasm. The bodies of these ghosts are marked by whatever injuries killed them and often driven by some craving for some aspect of the living world, such as food or music. A manifested ghost may fairly easily be returned to his body by resurrection magic and so in the City of Manifest one may die a great many times and be returned to his body with no harmful side effects. The one danger in exploring the other side of death as a ghost is the Calling, an unshakable urge that overcomes ghosts at some point in their unlife that drives them to forsake the world and pass into the True Afterlife. Such a transition is permanent and marks the end of a character

While all sentient races have spirits,  only the human and demihuman races (human, half-elf, half-orc, elf, gnome, dwarf, and halfling) can travel to Manifest and live again as ghosts. A great many nonhuman races are jealous of this gift, and have sought to destroy Manifest throughout its history. Several times they have succeeded, razing the city to the ground, forcing it to be rebuilt atop its own ruins. This has resulted in an underworld of forgotten catacombs, all that is left of the many cities left behind. Below these are vast natural caverns and tunnels that increase in size and complexity surrounding the Veil of Souls. All of these are filled with all manner of monsters and villains, but also treasures lost. Hence Manifest is home to adventurers as well as mourners and the dead

Of the enemies of the City of Manifest, perhaps the most persistent are the Yuan-ti, snake people who long for power and immortality and thus hate everything the city stands for.

Chapter summary
Introduction: Includes information on the campaign options and the general concept of Ghostwalk and the city of Manifest itself.
 All About Ghosts.: Contains information on the nature of Ghosts presented in the book as well as their characteristics and powers. The two ghost classes are introduced: The Eidolon and Eidoloncer as well as several prestige classes involving ghosts. New Skills and Feats are also introduced as well as new equipment, spells and magical items.
The City of Manifest Has information on the City itself as well as its history and new gods unique to the setting. Information on adventures and the city's lay out and workings is also provided.
 The Ghostwalk Campaign: Provides information on how to run adventures in the setting as well as themes and enemies often encountered.
 Countries: Documents countries that exist around the city of Manifest and their relationship to the city.
 Monsters : Contains several new monsters for use in the campaign:
Artaaglith (Demon)
Bonesinger (Template)
Dread Ram
Ectoplasmic Vermin
Fire Spectre
Ghost (Template)
Ghosteater
Monstrous Vampire (Template)
Mumia (Template)
Necroplasm
Spectral Seed
Spirit Tree
Undead Martyr
Yuan-Ti (Template)
 Adventures : Contains seven adventures to get started in the city of Manifest that range from level one to twelve.

Publication history
Ghostwalk was published in June 2003, and was written by Monte Cook and Sean K. Reynolds. Cover art was by Brom, with interior art by Thomas Baxa, Dennis Cramer, Michael Dutton, Emily Fiegenschuh, Jeremy Jarvis, David Martin, Puddnhead, Vinod Rams, Wayne Reynolds, Scott Roller, Richard Sardinha, and Ron Spencer.

Sean Reynolds explained where the idea came from, to make it possible to play a dead player character as a ghost: "I think it was just a matter of Monte and me understanding that one of the least fun parts of the game is when a character dies. Not only is there a feeling of loss regarding the character, but also the player doesn't have anything to do until a new character can be brought in. We thought a campaign where a character's death wouldn't be the end of play for that character or player would be a neat twist on standard D&D."

Reception

Reviews
SF Site

References

External links
 Ghostwalk forum at The Piazza (largest fan community online)

Dungeons & Dragons campaign settings
Dungeons & Dragons sourcebooks
Role-playing game supplements introduced in 2003